Youyi County is a county of eastern Heilongjiang province, People's Republic of China. It is under the jurisdiction of the prefecture-level city of Shuangyashan.

Administrative divisions 
Youyi County is divided into 4 towns, 6 townships and 1 ethnic township. 
4 towns
 Youyi, Xinglong, Longshan, Fenggang
6 townships
 Xingsheng, Dongjian, Qingfeng, Jianshe, Youlin, Xinzhen
1 ethnic township
 Chengfu Korean and Manchu

Demographics 

Notes and references 

Youyi
Shuangyashan